Monte Grammondo is a mountain in Liguria, northern Italy, part of the Alps.

Geography 
The mountain is located in the provinces of Imperia in Italy and Alpes-Maritimes in France. It lies at an altitude of 1378 metres.

SOIUSA classification 
According to the SOIUSA (International Standardized Mountain Subdivision of the Alps) the mountain can be classified in the following way:
 main part = Western Alps
 major sector = South Western Alps
 section = Maritime Alps
 subsection = (Fr:Préalpes de Nice/It:Prealpi di Nizza)
 supergroup = (Fr:Groupe Rocaillon-Grand Braus/It: Gruppo Rocaillon-Grand Braus) 
 group = (Fr:Chaîne Grand Baus-Razet-Grandmont/It:Catena Braus-Razet-Grandmont) 
 code = I/A-2.II-A.2

Access to the summit 
Grammondo's top can be reached  on foot from Bevera valley starting from the villages of Sospel (in France), Olivetta, Torri, San Pancrazio or Villatella (Italy), and also from Castellar and Castillon, located in the valleys nearby Menton (France).

Conservation 
The Italian slopes of Monte Grammondo,  along with most of the Ligurian part of Bévéra valley, belongs to a SIC (Site of Community Importance) called M. Grammondo T. Bevera (code IT 1315717).

References

Mountains of the Ligurian Alps
Mountains of Liguria
Mountains of Alpes-Maritimes
One-thousanders of Italy
One-thousanders of France
France–Italy border
International mountains of Europe
Mountains partially in France